Thomas Penny (1532 – January 1589) was an English physician and early entomologist. His solo works have not survived and he is primarily known through quotations from other sixteenth-century biologists. It is believed that he broke with Aristotle on classification of caterpillars. He was also a Puritan and as such kept a low profile during the reign of Queen Mary I of England. He is perhaps best known for being partly responsible for the Insectorum, sive, Minimorum animalium theatrum or Theatre of Insects. This work was written jointly by Conrad Gessner (posthumously), Edward Edward Wotton, Thomas Muffet, and Thomas Penny.

Penny suffered from asthma and dosed himself with woodlice crushed in wine.

References

Further reading
D. E. Allen, ‘Penny, Thomas (c.1530–1589)’, Oxford Dictionary of National Biography, Oxford University Press, 2004

English entomologists
16th-century English medical doctors
16th-century Puritans
1532 births
1589 deaths